State Trunk Highway 111 (often called Highway 111, STH-111 or WIS 111) is a state highway in the U.S. state of Wisconsin. It runs from U.S. Route 8 (US 8) near Catawba north to Highway 13 south of Phillips. The highway is located entirely within Price County. Highway 111 is maintained by the Wisconsin Department of Transportation.

Route description
Highway 111 begins at a junction with US 8 in the Town of Catawba, east of the village of the same name. The highway heads north through a rural area, crossing into the Town of Harmony. It runs through a mixture of forest and farmland, passing to the east of Lake Sixteen. Past a junction with County Highway J, the highway curves to the northeast. After it intersects several local roads, the route turns west into the Town of Worcester and terminates at Highway 13. The road continues east as the unmarked Little Chicago Road.

Major intersections

See also

References

External links

111
Transportation in Price County, Wisconsin